Dan Pedersen is a retired United States Navy Captain, credited as being the leading force behind the creation of the United States Navy Fighter Weapons School program known as “TOPGUN”.

Military career
Pedersen joined the Navy in 1953 as an enlisted mechanic. In 1955 he was accepted into the Naval Aviation Cadet Program. After completing flight training on 1 March 1957 he was assigned to VF(AW)-3 flying the Douglas F4D Skyray.

In 1962 he reported to VF-121, the west coast Fleet Replacement Squadron, for transition training to fly the McDonnell F3H Demon following which he was assigned to VF-213. In February 1963 VF-213 embarked on an 8-month cruise onboard .

After transition training to fly the McDonnell-Douglas F-4 Phantom II he joined VF-92.

In late 1968 Pedersen joined VF-121 at Miramar as a tactics instructor.

In January 1969, the Navy published the Ault Report, which concluded that U.S. aircraft losses over North Vietnam stemmed in part from inadequate air-crew training in air combat maneuvering (ACM). The report recommended that an "Advanced Fighter Weapons School" be established at Naval Air Station Miramar under the control of VF-121 to revive and disseminate community fighter expertise throughout the fleet. The report stated that the Advanced Fighter Weapons School was to have: one Officer-in-charge (F-4 or F-8 Crusader pilot), three F-4 pilot instructors, three F-4 Radar Intercept Officer instructors, three F-8 pilot instructors and an Aviation Ordnance Officer. The school would train 20 F-4 aircrews and 10 F-8 pilots per year. The aircrew syllabus would consist of 25 hours per pilot/aircrew in the F-8 or F-4, 75 hours of classes and a course duration of four weeks. Pedersen was appointed as the first officer in charge of the school.

The Fighter Weapons School was established on 3 March 1969. Following the implementation of the program, the Navy kill ratio in Vietnam went from 2.5:1 to 24:1.

He relinquished command of the school in mid-1969.

In February 1973 he joined VF-143 on the USS Enterprise and flew combat operations over Laos and Cambodia until the Enterprise returned to Pearl Harbor in June 1973. He was later appointed commander of VF-143 and the squadron embarked onboard  for a Mediterranean cruise from 3 January to 3 August 1974.

During this time he flew fighter cover in support of the Mayaguez Incident.

In 1976 he was promoted to Captain and subsequently attended the Prospective Commanding Officers Course. From 28 March 1978 to 21 December 1979 he commanded the tanker .

On 20 October 1980 he became the captain of the aircraft carrier . In April 1981 Airman Recruit Paul A. Trerice died in the Rangers correctional custody unit. Trerice's father brought a lawsuit against Pedersen, Rangers executive officer and others but the case was dismissed. On 11 June 1982 he relinquished command of Ranger and became deputy chief of staff for the Commander, U.S. Pacific Fleet at Pearl Harbor.

Due to political opposition as a result of Trerice's death, his name was removed from the 1983 promotion list to Rear admiral and he retired from the Navy on 1 March 1983.

Later life 
The success of TOPGUN earned him the title the ‘Godfather of TOPGUN’.

In 2018, one year prior to the fiftieth anniversary of the founding of TOPGUN, Pedersen was honored at Palm Springs Air Museum Gala.

In 2019, his book TOPGUN: An American Story was published to critical acclaim. In the book he warned that U.S. Naval Aviators weren't getting enough flight time, weren't practicing dogfighting and that an over-reliance on technology risked repeating the situation that occurred in the early years of the Vietnam War.

See also
 Top Gun (1986 film)

References

United States Naval Flight Officers
American military writers
20th-century American naval officers
American Vietnam War pilots
United States Navy personnel of the Vietnam War